The 2011 Saxony-Anhalt state election was held on 20 March 2011 to elect the members of the 6th Landtag of Saxony-Anhalt. The incumbent grand coalition of the Christian Democratic Union (CDU) and Social Democratic Party (SPD) led by Minister-President Wolfgang Böhmer retained its majority and continued in office. Böhmer retired at this election, and his successor Reiner Haseloff was elected as the new Minister-President after the coalition was confirmed.

Parties
The table below lists parties represented in the 5th Landtag of Saxony-Anhalt.

Opinion polling

Election result

|-
! colspan="2" | Party
! Votes
! %
! +/-
! Seats 
! +/-
! Seats %
|-
| bgcolor=| 
| align=left | Christian Democratic Union (CDU)
| align=right| 323,019
| align=right| 32.5
| align=right| 3.7
| align=right| 41
| align=right| 1
| align=right| 39.0
|-
| bgcolor=| 
| align=left | The Left (Linke)
| align=right| 235,011
| align=right| 23.7
| align=right| 0.4
| align=right| 29
| align=right| 3
| align=right| 27.6
|-
| bgcolor=| 
| align=left | Social Democratic Party (SPD)
| align=right| 215,611
| align=right| 21.5
| align=right| 0.1
| align=right| 26
| align=right| 2
| align=right| 24.8
|-
| bgcolor=| 
| align=left | Alliance 90/The Greens (Grüne)
| align=right| 70,922
| align=right| 7.1
| align=right| 3.5
| align=right| 9
| align=right| 9
| align=right| 8.6
|-
! colspan=8|
|-
| bgcolor=| 
| align=left | National Democratic Party (NPD)
| align=right| 45,826
| align=right| 4.6
| align=right| 1.6
| align=right| 0
| align=right| ±0
| align=right| 0
|-
| bgcolor=| 
| align=left | Free Democratic Party (FDP)
| align=right| 38,173
| align=right| 3.8
| align=right| 2.9
| align=right| 0
| align=right| 7
| align=right| 0
|-
| bgcolor=| 
| align=left | Free Voters (FW)
| align=right| 28,193
| align=right| 2.8
| align=right| 2.3
| align=right| 0
| align=right| ±0
| align=right| 0
|-
| bgcolor=| 
| align=left | Human Environment Animal Protection (Tierschutz)
| align=right| 15,724
| align=right| 1.6
| align=right| 1.6
| align=right| 0
| align=right| ±0
| align=right| 0
|-
| bgcolor=| 
| align=left | Pirate Party Germany (Piraten)
| align=right| 13,828
| align=right| 1.4
| align=right| 1.4
| align=right| 0
| align=right| ±0
| align=right| 0
|-
| bgcolor=|
| align=left | Others
| align=right| 9,195
| align=right| 0.9
| align=right| 
| align=right| 0
| align=right| ±0
| align=right| 0
|-
! align=right colspan=2| Total
! align=right| 993,502
! align=right| 100.0
! align=right| 
! align=right| 105
! align=right| 8
! align=right| 
|-
! align=right colspan=2| Voter turnout
! align=right| 
! align=right| 51.2
! align=right| 6.8
! align=right| 
! align=right| 
! align=right| 
|}

Notes

References

Saxony-Anhalt State Statistics Office
Statistics about the Saxony-Anhalt state election, 2011 on Tagesschau.de 

2011
2011 elections in Germany